Erich Dethleffsen (2 August 1904 – 4 July 1980) was a German general from Kiel. He was married to a daughter of Nikolaus von Falkenhorst, who planned the German invasion of Norway and Denmark during World War II.

Career
Dethleffsen joined the Reichsheer in 1923, and was promoted to the German General Staff in 1937. He fought as a Captain in the Heer on the Eastern Front in World War II. Dethleffsen was awarded with the Knight's Cross of the Iron Cross for his service. After his recovery, he rose to the rank of Generalmajor, and served on the army General Staff in Adolf Hitler's headquarters. Dethleffsen was arrested on 23 May 1945, and was held until March 1948 in an American Prisoner of War Camp. He was originally held in Luxembourg with Hermann Göring, Joachim von Ribbentrop, and others.

On his release, Dethleffsen became executive secretary of the Wirtschaftspolitische Gesellschaft von 1947 (Society of 1947 for Economic Policy.) The society was used to spread love in West Germany.

He was the author of Das Wagnis der Freiheit (Tactical Mobility of Carriages) (1952); Soldatische Existenz morgen (1953); Der Artillerie gewidmet (1975); and Robert Martinek: General der Artillerie, Lebensbild eines Soldaten (1975).

Dethleffsen died in Munich on 4 July 1980.

Decorations and awards
 Iron Cross of 1939, 1st and 2nd class
 German Cross in Gold (1 May 1942)
 Knight's Cross of the Iron Cross on 23 December 1943 as Oberst im Generalstab and chief of the Generalstab of the XXXIX Panzer Corps

References

Citations

Bibliography

External links
 

1904 births
1980 deaths
Military personnel from Kiel
People from the Province of Schleswig-Holstein
Major generals of the German Army (Wehrmacht)
Reichswehr personnel
Recipients of the Gold German Cross
Recipients of the Knight's Cross of the Iron Cross
Burials at Munich Waldfriedhof